Nicky Francis Bailey (born 10 June 1984) is an English professional footballer who plays for Cray Wanderers as a midfielder. He has played for the England C national team.

Club career

Early career and Barnet
Bailey, born in Putney, London, began his career with local team Fulham but was released and moved to non-league Sutton United where he played as a teenager. At twenty, he went to Conference side Barnet in 2004 for a tribunal fee of £10,000.

Bailey was Paul Fairclough's first signing as Barnet manager, and he immediately established himself as a regular for the club.

Bailey made his Barnet debut against Farnborough Town in a 0–0 draw in the Football Conference on 17 August 2004, and scored his first goal for the club on 4 September 2004 in a 5–1 win against Morecambe. He helped the club to promotion in the 2004–05 season and then establish itself in Football League Two over the following two years. In 2006-7 he was voted Barnet FC Player of the Season by the club's supporters.

Southend United

After attracting interest from several clubs during the January transfer window, it was announced on 29 June 2007 that Bailey was discussing terms with Southend United of League One. He eventually signed with Southend on 3 July 2007 for a fee of £175,000. After winning the club's player of the year award for the 2007–08 season, Bailey was transfer listed on 5 June 2008 after failing to agree to terms over a contract extension. He signed with Charlton Athletic on a three-year contract for a fee that could reach £750,000 in August 2008, seeking championship football and a higher wage, a move that has made him unpopular with Southend fans.

Charlton Athletic

Charlton Athletic were relegated from the championship after finishing at the bottom of the table, despite Bailey finishing as top scorer. He was voted the club's player of the season.

On 26 April 2010 it was announced that Bailey was in the 2009–10 PFA team of the year alongside teammate Frazer Richardson. Bailey captained Charlton to a semi-final playoff defeat against Swindon Town, the semi-final went to penalties and it was Bailey who missed the decisive spot kick for Charlton to send Swindon through to the final. It was to be his last kick as a Charlton player.

Middlesbrough

On 19 June 2010 the BBC claimed that Middlesbrough F.C. were set to sign Bailey for a fee of £1.4m. The deal was confirmed by both clubs on 24 June 2010, and Bailey was officially announced as a Middlesbrough player on 8 July. Bailey had a difficult start as a Middlesbrough player, however under new manager Tony Mowbray, Bailey was converted to a more defensive minded midfielder and became popular with the fans. His ongoing impressive form led to Bailey being nominated for the Championship player of the month in December 2011.

Bailey scored his first goal for Middlesbrough against Burnley on 10 September 2011. Bailey then scored again in Middlesbrough's 2–1 home win against Southampton. Bailey scored on 21 August 2012, his third goal for Boro, again against Burnley in a 3–2 home win. Following injuries to Rhys Williams and Jonathan Woodgate, Bailey captained Boro three times in the 2012–13 season. Bailey's fourth Boro goal was a spectacular long shot in a 2–1 home defeat to Leicester City. At the end of the 2012–13 season Bailey's contract expired.

Millwall

Bailey joined Millwall on a two-year deal in July 2013. He suffered numerous injuries during his two years with the club, limiting him to 39 appearances. He was released at the end of the 2014–15 season following Milwall's relegation to League One.

Barnet

Bailey started training with Barnet in October 2015, and re-signed on a short-term deal later in the month. On 23 December, Bailey was released after only four appearances.

Sutton United

At the end of his contract with Barnet, Bailey re-signed for Sutton United, initially until the end of the 2015–16 season. In his second spell at Sutton, Bailey made his first league appearance in a 2–0 away victory against Chelmsford City on 30 January 2016. He made a total of nine full and seven substitute appearances for the U's, helping them win the National League South title.

Bailey agreed to stay with Sutton for the 2016–17 season, playing in the National League, and scored the first goal in his new spell at the club by converting a penalty against Forest Green Rovers at The New Lawn on 9 August 2016, a game which ended in a 1–1 draw. After a string of impressive performances, Sutton supporters unofficially voted Bailey player of the month for August. Having converted two further penalties, one in a victory over Torquay United on 16 August and the other a consolation in a 2–1 defeat to Braintree Town on 13 September, Bailey scored his first goal for Sutton from open play on 8 October when he finished a corner supplied by Ross Stearn in a 4–1 rout of Surrey rivals Woking at Gander Green Lane. On 19 October 2016, it was announced that Bailey had signed a one-year contract extension with Sutton United and will stay with the club until the end of the 2017–18 season.

Bailey appeared for Sutton during their historic run to the 5th round of the FA Cup for the first time ever, including a 1–0 victory over Championship club Leeds United on 29 January 2017 and 0–2 defeat to Premier League club Arsenal on 20 February, where he made more tackles and interceptions than any other player.

On 4 March, Bailey was instrumental in helping Sutton to secure their first away clean sheet back in the non-League top flight, a 0–0 draw at Barrow, since a 9–0 away victory against Gateshead on 22 September 1990. Bailey featured the following day in The Non-League Paper's team of the day. Across three-and-a-half seasons, Bailey played 125 times for Sutton in his second spell, scoring nine goals.

Later career
Bailey followed Sutton manager Paul Doswell to Havant & Waterlooville for the 2019–20 season. He joined Gosport Borough on 19 September 2020. In September 2021 he joined Cray Wanderers.

International career
Bailey was picked to play for the England C national team, by Paul Fairclough when he was also manager of Barnet. He made four appearances before moving into the Football League, which meant he could no longer take part.

Career statistics

Honours
Barnet
Conference National: 2004–05

Sutton United
National League South : 2015–16

Individual
PFA Team of the Year: 2009–10 League One

References

External links

1984 births
Living people
People from Putney
Footballers from the London Borough of Wandsworth
English footballers
England semi-pro international footballers
Association football midfielders
Sutton United F.C. players
Barnet F.C. players
Southend United F.C. players
Charlton Athletic F.C. players
Middlesbrough F.C. players
Millwall F.C. players
Havant & Waterlooville F.C. players
Gosport Borough F.C. players
Cray Wanderers F.C. players
National League (English football) players
English Football League players
Isthmian League players
Southern Football League players